Faial may refer to the following places:

Faial Island, an island of the Azores, Portugal
Faial da Terra, a civil parish in the municipality of Povoação, Azores, Portugal
Faial (Santana), a civil parish in the municipality of Santana, Madeira, Portugal